Fairwinds Credit Union is an American member-owned credit union that is headquartered in Orlando, Florida, and serves the Central Florida area. Fairwinds is regulated under the authority of the National Credit Union Administration (NCUA) and has 178,000 members and assets of $2.1 billion. The credit union, opened in 1949, has 492 full-time employees and 69 part-time employees, or 340 members per employee, compared to a national average of 455.

Fairwinds is the official credit union for Universal Orlando and its team members since 2006. Additionally, Fairwinds is a sponsor of the Orlando Solar Bears since 2014, as well as the official credit union for Orlando City Soccer Club.

Starting in 2012, Fairwinds became the official banking partner of the University of Central Florida, its students, and alumni. Since 2005, there has been an on campus FAIRWINDS Alumni Center which offers a 10,000 square foot facility for alumni or students to rent next to the Addition Financial Arena. 

In 2022, Fairwinds announced the acquisition of Citizens Bank of Florida in Oviedo, Florida.

References
General:
 
 

In-text:

Credit unions based in Florida
Banks established in 1949
Companies based in Orlando, Florida
1949 establishments in Florida